Ajeeb - The Other Side is an Indian television series set in a hospital where something strange is always going on.

Cast
 Aarti Thakur as Anjali Verma
 Vishal Watwani as Dr. Dev Malhotra
 Manish Goel as Anthony
 Shweta Tiwari
 Sakshi Tanwar
 Varun Badola
 Shruti Seth
 Payal Nair

Awards
Ajeeb received the Jury award for Best Thriller at the 8th Annual Indian Television Academy Awards in 2008.

References

9X (TV channel) original programming
2008 Indian television series debuts
Indian medical television series
Indian thriller television series